The Maysville Historic District is a historic district in Mobile, Alabama, United States. Platted in 1871 in the midst of a recession in Mobile, the neighborhood did not begin to develop until the late 1890s. Maysville has long been a working class neighborhood; many late 1890s and early 1900s houses were bungalows and cottages, some with modest Victorian influences. Some larger and more decorated houses were built in the northeastern portion of the neighborhood. In the early 20th century and into World War I and World War II, the Port of Mobile and its shipyards became a focus of Mobile's economy, and the population grew in response. The early 20th century saw many craftsman-style bungalows and four square houses built. Minimalist Traditional and some ranch-style houses became popular around and after World War II. Notable contributing buildings in the district are Ladd–Peebles Stadium, built in 1948, and Williamson High School, built in 1965. The district was listed on the National Register of Historic Places in 2013.

References

National Register of Historic Places in Mobile, Alabama
Historic districts in Mobile, Alabama
Historic districts on the National Register of Historic Places in Alabama
Working-class culture in the United States